Deadly Desire is a 1991 made-for-TV thriller film directed by Charles Corell and starring Jack Scalia, Kathryn Harrold, and Will Patton.

Synopsis
Frank Decker (Scalia) is an ex-Los Angeles policeman now partnered in a private security firm in San Diego. During the course of his job, he meets and falls in love with the beautiful Angela (Harrold) who's unhappily married to the rich and dangerous Giles Menteer (Patton). The complications which result from this "triangle" follow a pattern reminiscent of Double Indemnity and Body Heat.

External links 
 
 

1991 television films
1991 films
1991 thriller films
USA Network original films
American thriller television films
Cockfighting in film
1990s English-language films
Films directed by Charles Correll
1990s American films